Testability is a primary aspect of Science and the Scientific Method and is a property applying to an empirical hypothesis, involves two components:
Falsifiability or defeasibility, which means that counterexamples to the hypothesis are logically possible.
The practical feasibility of observing a reproducible series of such counterexamples if they do exist.

In short, a hypothesis is testable if there is a possibility of deciding whether it is true or false based on experimentation by anyone. This allows anyone to decide whether a theory can be supported or refuted by data. However, the interpretation of experimental data may be also inconclusive or uncertain. Karl Popper introduced the concept that scientific knowledge had the property of falsifiability as published in ''The Logic of Scientific Discovery.

See also

 Confirmability
 Controllability
 Observability
 Scientific method
 Test method

Further reading

 
  Robert Kegan and Lisa Lahey suggest how to turn personal tacit assumptions into explicit testable hypotheses in everyday life.

References 

Logic
Observation
Philosophy of science